National Highway 516 (NH 516) is a National Highway in India that connects Narendrapur with Gopalpur in Odisha. The total length of the highway is 8.3 km.

Route
Narendrapur - Karpalli - Gopalpur

See also
 List of National Highways in India (by Highway Number)
 List of National Highways in India
 National Highways Development Project

References

External links
 NH 516 on OpenStreetMap
 National Highways in Orissa

516
National highways in India